is a 2004 Japanese horror and thriller film directed by Kei Horie. The film stars Asami Mizukawa, Shūji Kashiwabara, Chisato Morishita, and Mayuka Suzuki in the lead roles.

Cast
 Asami Mizukawa
 Shūji Kashiwabara
 Mayuka Suzuki
 Tomohisa Yuge
 Fumina Hara
 Maki Horikita
 Kanji Tsuda
 Chisato Morishita
 Joe Hyūga
 Kei Horie
 Amiko Kanaya

References

External links
 
 

2000s Japanese-language films
2004 films
Japanese horror films
Japanese thriller films
Kṣitigarbha
2000s Japanese films